Kalev is an Estonian masculine given name, derived from national folk hero Kalev. Related Finnish names are Kaleva and Kalevi.

Its meaning is most often "giant", "tall strong man". The etymology is uncertain. The Russian word голова (golova), "head" as in "headman" has been suggested, but is linguistically anachronistic. However, it could be Baltic (kalējs, "smith"), Finnic (kalea, "cool, hard") or Norse (Hlér, a sea god, from *xlewaz, or *xalewaz with an epenthetic vowel). It appears in historical records from 15th century onwards, although an uncertain mention dates to the 12th century.

People named Kalev include:
Kalev Aigro (born 1959), Nordic combined skier
Kalev Arro (1915–1974), partisan 
Kalev Ermits (born 1992), biathlete and cross-country skier 
Kalev Kallemets (born 1979), politician
Kalev Kallo (born 1948), politician
Kalev Kesküla (1959–2010), writer
Kalev Mark Kostabi, known as Mark Kostabi (born 1960), American painter
Kalev Kotkas (born 1960), Estonian politician
Kalev Leetaru, American internet entrepreneur and academic
Kalev Lillo (born 1966), Estonian politician
Kalev Muru (born 1954), Estonian mountaineer
Kalev Sepp, American military analyst and strategist and former military officer

References

Estonian masculine given names